Saqlain Sajib (born 1 December 1988) is a first-class and List A cricketer from Bangladesh.  He made his debut for Rajshahi Division in 2006/07, making 17 against Chittagong Division on his first-class debut and proving potent with the ball in the one day arena, taking a best of 2 for 26 against Khulna Division. He made his international debut for the Bangladesh cricket team in March 2016.

International career
In 2016, Sajib was added to Bangladesh's squad for the 2016 ICC World Twenty20 after Arafat Sunny was suspended from bowling with an illegal action. He played only one match in the tournament against Australia. He made his Twenty20 International (T20I) debut on 21 March 2016 against Australia in the 2016 ICC World Twenty20 tournament which was his only international match till date in his whole career.

References

External links
 
 

1988 births
Living people
Bangladeshi cricketers
Bangladesh Twenty20 International cricketers
Rajshahi Division cricketers
Dhaka Dominators cricketers
Rajshahi Royals cricketers
Mohammedan Sporting Club cricketers
Chittagong Division cricketers
Rangpur Riders cricketers
Bangladesh North Zone cricketers
Bangladesh A cricketers
People from Rajshahi District